Acrozoanthus is a monototypic genus of soft coral, anthozoans in the family Zoanthidae. It is represented by a single species, Acrozoanthus australiae, which is also known by the common names stick polyp, tree stick polyp, tree anemone, and encrusting stick anemone.

References

 
Zoanthidae
Hexacorallia genera